Zionsville is a village mostly in Upper Milford Township in Lehigh County, Pennsylvania with parts of the village located in Lower Milford Township. The West Branch Hosensack Creek forms its natural southeastern boundary and drains it via the Hosensack Creek to the Perkiomen Creek. 

Zionsville is part of the Lehigh Valley, which has a population of 861,899 and is the 68th most populated metropolitan area in the U.S. as of the 2020 census. Its ZIP Code is 18092.

History 

The area of modern-day Zionsville was once inhabited by the Lenape Indian tribes. 

The Lenape tribes were known to live along river fronts or creeks and using the fertile land around these areas for farming purposes. Due to the overwhelming harvesting and planting of the land, it degraded its quality and eventually could no longer sustain crop, leading to the land becoming uninhabitable and the tribes slowly left the area. In the 17th century, Dutch colonists arrived into the area and began buying animal pelts from the Lenape in exchange for European products. In 1682, William Penn and Quaker colonists arrived and founded the Pennsylvania Colony in the lower Delaware River. A peace treaty was signed with the newly arriving English and Lenape tribes, however in the decades building up an estimated 20,000 colonists arrived in the area forcing the Lenape to keep up with the colonists. The colony displaced many Lenape people and others were forced to assimilate.

When William Penn died in 1718, his two remaining sons, John and Thomas Penn, along with the leaders running the colony, stopped practicing William Penn's policies. Attempting to gain more money, they began considering selling land belonging to the Lenape in a agreement with the Penn family now known as the Walking Purchase. The Lenape were displaced from their land and as a result began raiding Pennsylvanian settlements. In 1788, most of the lasting Lenape were no longer living in the Pennsylvania region and began settling in the Ohio region.

Old Zionsville was founded in 1734 by a group of German settlers on Kings Highway Road, building multiple churches in the region with the oldest being a log cabin built in 1740 which is no longer standing. Modern day Zionsville was originally a part of Old Zionsville until 1876 when the Perkiomen Railroad was constructed around a mile southeast of Old Zionsville, leading to the founding of "Zionsville Station". Then the name changed to "New Zionsville" and changed again to Zionsville.

Demographics
As of the 2010 census, the population of Zionsville was 3,223. Among the population, 97.1% of the population is white, 0.3% is black, 0.2% is Native American, and 1.1% is Asian. The zip code is in Upper Milford and Lower Milford townships and, to a very small extent, in Hereford Township.

Zionsville is home to the historic Dillingersville Union School and Church, first built in 1735.

Industry
The Lehigh Crane Iron Company once maintained a hematite mine in Zionsville, which was served by the north-to-south Perkiomen Branch of the Reading Railroad. This line remains active north from Pennsuburg to Emmaus as a branch of the East Penn Railroad.

Climate
The climate type is very mild with the summer having high temperatures and humidity, and the winter containing cold to very cold temperatures and an average snowfall of 29.0" inches. According to the Koppen Climate Classification system, Zionsville is within the Humid Subtropical climate.

2009 post office closure
In January 2009, the Zionsville Post Office closed after the U.S. Postal Service refused to renew its lease. It served portions of Upper Milford, Lower Milford, and Hereford Township, including the villages of Corning, Dillingersville, Hosensack, Powder Valley, Sigmund, and some Five Points residents.

The residents of the ZIP Code 18092 have since been served by the Hereford Post Office but allowed to maintain the use of "Zionsville, PA 18092" as a legal part of the addresses. Zionsville PO Box customers have been hosted by the Old Zionsville Post Office while packages and certified mail that have to be signed for must be picked up in Hereford.

2020 explosion
On June 9, 2020, a shipping container containing modified fireworks accidentally detonated along Orchard Road causing a large mushroom cloud that was visible for miles. The explosion set another shipping container ablaze and caused another explosion, causing fireworks to launch into the air, setting nearby corn fields on fire and damaging property. Firefighters were dispatched, the fire was quickly extinguished, and officials discovered the body of Brian Ehret, the owner of the property. 

An investigation into the explosion by state officials and the ATF determined that terrorism was not involved in the explosion, and that Ehret had been modifying fireworks when the trailer caught ablaze and exploded. It is still unknown how the initial fire was started.

Public education
Zionsville is part of the East Penn School District. Students in grades 9-12 attend Emmaus High School. Students in grades six through eight attend either Eyer Middle School or Lower Macungie Middle School, both located in Macungie. Part of Zionsville, near the village's end in Lower Milford Township, is in the Southern Lehigh School District, where high school students attend Southern Lehigh High School in Center Valley.

Notable people
Raymond Bryan Dillard, former professor, Westminster Theological Seminary
Pat Toomey, U.S. Senator

Notes

Unincorporated communities in Lehigh County, Pennsylvania
Unincorporated communities in Pennsylvania